The Old English poem Judith describes the beheading of Assyrian general Holofernes by Israelite Judith of Bethulia. It is found in the same manuscript as the heroic poem Beowulf, the Nowell Codex (London, British Library, Cotton MS Vitellius A. XV), dated ca. 975–1025. The Old English poem is one of many retellings of the Holofernes–Judith tale as it was found in the Book of Judith, still present in the Catholic and Orthodox Christian Bibles. The other extant version is by Ælfric of Eynsham, late 10th-century Anglo-Saxon abbot and writer; his version is a homily (in prose) of the tale.

History and incompleteness
Judith was first discovered as an appendage to the Nowell Codex. Though it is certain that the poem is a derivative of the Book of Judith, still present in the Roman Catholic Bible, its authorship and year of origin remain a mystery.

The poem is incomplete: the version in the manuscript is 348 lines long, divided in three sections marked with the numbers X, XI, and XII. The numbers correspond to the 10th verse of chapter twelve, the 11th verse of chapter thirteen, and the 12th verse of chapter fourteen. Only the last three out of twelve cantos have been preserved. What remains of the poem opens in the middle of a banquet. Had the first nine cantos been preserved, it is often thought that Judith would be considered one of the most laudable Old English works.
What is certain about the origin of the poem is that it stems from the Book of Judith. After the Reformation, the Book of Judith was removed from the Protestant Bible. However, it is still present in the Roman Catholic and Eastern Orthodox Bibles. Many discrepancies exist between the poem and Book, most notably in regards to the portrayal of Holofernes and the exaggeration of Judith’s righteousness in the poem.

It is unknown when Judith became fragmented, but it is suggested that it was already fragmented when Laurence Nowell signed the manuscript in the 1500s. The quantity of the missing text is widely debated. Some scholars use the Apocryphal Judith as evidence for the text missing, while others refute this as unreliable as the Old English poet is not loyal to this source.

It is evident that the story of Judith has been modified and set within the framework of Anglo-Saxon context. Much of the geographic and political structures relevant to a Hebrew culture have been removed, allowing an Anglo-Saxon audience to better understand and relate to the poem.

Plot, structure and themes

Like Beowulf, Judith conveys a moral tale of heroic triumph over monstrous beings, if we follow the supposition of Andy Orchard’s Pride and Prodigies: Studies in the Monsters of the Beowulf Manuscript. Both moral and political, the poem tells of a brave woman’s efforts to save and protect her people. Judith is depicted as an exemplar woman, grounded by ideal morale, probity, courage, and religious conviction. Judith's character is rendered blameless and virtuous, and her beauty is praised. In line 109, Judith is referred to as an ides ellenrof, "a brave woman". The author gives her the entitlement of a halige meowle (line 56), "holy woman", and a snoteran idese (line 55), "wise woman", whilst her appearance is described as aelfscinu (line 13), "elf-shining", "beautiful". Although Judith kills a man, she appears to be doing God's will; Holofernes, while described to some extent as a standard military leader in the Beowulfian vein, is also cast as a salacious drunk and becomes monstrous in his excess.

Portraying the epitome of Germanic heroism, Judith was likely composed during a time of war as a model for the Anglo-Saxon people. The Abbot Ælfric similarly created his own homiletic interpretation of the Book of Judith. At the time of his creation, Vikings were ransacking England. Ælfric professed that Judith was to serve as an example to the people. In a letter, Ælfric wrote: þeo is eac on English on ure wisan iset eow mannum to bisne, þet ge eower eard mid wæpnum beweriæn wið onwinnende here, meaning "It is also set as an example for you in English according to our style, so that you will defend your land with weapons against an attacking force".

Ælfric’s Judith is quite like that of the poem; furthermore, the characters seem to have served the same purpose—to stand as an example to the people in a time of war. Judith's city of Bethulia was being plundered by Assyrians. Holofernes was an Assyrian general and king, often drunk and constantly monstrous. 

The Vulgate Liber Iudith, the posited source text of these works, has been mutilated in order to contain the Anglo-Saxon heroic mode:

“Perhaps the most striking difference between the Old English Judith and the Vulgate version is
the setting of the story. In the Vulgate version of the story, Judith’s people, the citizens of Bethulia in particular and the Israelites in general, are shown as more religious than martial, led by priests and elders,rather than kings and generals. The Old English poet deliberately chose to place Judith in a more military setting. Thus, the seeming paradox of a woman as the military leader of her people is not just the result of a difficulty in adapting a biblical story to a Germanic heroic idiom.”

There are also key narrative details: the Old English Judith, after severing the head of Holofernes, proudly displayed his head to her Hebrew army and led them into a victorious battle against the Assyrians. In contrast, in the Book of Judith, the Assyrians simply fled Bethulia after discovering the deceased body of Holofernes.

Poetic techniques 
Judith contains many of the poetic techniques common to Old English heroic poetry. Alliteration is apparent throughout, as the poem is part of the Old English alliterative tradition. The poem also includes variation, which is poetic repetition through the use of varying descriptions. An example is found in the description of God, who at various times is referred to as 'ælmihtigan' (the Almighty), 'mihtig Dryhten' (mighty Lord) and 'Scyppende' (Creator). Variation serves to emphasise importance.

Destruction and preservation
The only existing copy of the poem is in the Beowulf manuscript, immediately following Beowulf. Damage to the manuscript was caused by the Cotton fire of 1731 and readings have been lost. In order to account for these lost words, modern editions of the poem are supplemented by references to Edward Thwaites' 1698 edition.

Authorship and date
The consensus held by modern scholars allocates Judith to the authorship of Cynewulf, though several opposing theories have been proposed. The atypical absence of Cynewulf’s runic signature has led many not to attribute authorship to him. Stylistically, the poem so strongly reflects the Cynewulfian school that it may just as likely been written by one of Cynewulf’s successors. The existing manuscript text of Judith, following Beowulf in the manuscript, was copied by the second of two scribes.

Palaeography 
Much codicological and palaeographical evidence was lost in the Ashburnham House fire of 1731, including threads, folds and prick-marks. Studies in palaeography are, however, important and of interest when studying Judith and the constituent texts within the Nowell Codex, as the manuscript is written in two hands. Judith is in the hand of the second scribe, as is Beowulf from line 1939 onwards.

Orthography 
In the Nowell Codex, the lack of scribal regularization is of note. The absence of -io spellings in Judith is of interest, in contrast to the ‘126’ <io> spellings in Beowulf, (totalling the pages transcribed by both A and B.) 

As Peter Lucas has demonstrated, Scribe A, who copied the first 87 MS pages of Beowulf, made sure to use regularised <eo> spellings in ‘The Letter of Alexander the Great to Aristotle’, (66 instances,) and 'The Marvels of the East,’ (2 instances). 

Conversely, The Life of St Christopher does not contain any <io> spellings, which leads to Lucas’ claim, that it is “extremely probable that Quire 14, containing Judith, is the nearest surviving part of the manuscript to its lost beginning, and that the quire was linked to the present Quire by just one quire, designated *0, at least part of which was discarded only as relatively recently as c. 1600.”

See also
 Judith (homily)
 Book of Judith
 Nowell Codex

References

Works cited

 Lapidge, Michael. Blackwell Encyclopedia of Anglo-Saxon England (1991).
 Campbell, J.J. "Schematic Technique in Judith". English Literary History 38 (1971),pp. 155–72
 Catholic Encyclopedia: "Book of Judith"
 Chamberlain, D. "Judith: a Fragmentary and Political Poem". Anglo-Saxon Poetry: Essays in Appreciation for John C. McGalliard, ed. L. E. Nicholson and D. W. Frese (Notre Dame, Indiana, 1975),pp. 145–59.
 Clayton, M. Ælfric's Judith: manipulative or manipulated? (1994) pp. 215–227.
 Cook, A.S. Judith, an old English epic fragment. Edited, with introd., facsim., translation, complete glossary, and various indexes, (Heath, Boston, 1889)
 Cubitt, C. "Virginity and Misogyny in Tenth- and Eleventh-Century England", Gender and History, Vol. 12. No. 1. (2000), pp. 14–18
 Dobbie, E. "Beowulf and Judith", ASPR vol. 4 (Columbia University Press, New York, 1953)
 Kennedy, Charles W. Early English Christian Poetry. New York: Oxford University Press, 1961.
 Lee, S.D. Ælfric’s Homlies on Judith, Esther, and The Maccabees, 
 Lucas, Peter J. “The Place of Judith in the Beowulf-Manuscript.” The Review of English Studies, vol. 41, no. 164, 1990, pp. 463–78. JSTOR, http://www.jstor.org/stable/516274. Accessed 13 Jan. 2023.
 Marsden, Richard. "Judith". The Cambridge Old English Reader. 1st ed. Ed. Richard Marsden. United Kingdom: Cambridge University Press, 2004. Pages 147–148.
 Nelson, M. ed., Judith, Juliana, and Elene: Three fighting Saints, (Peter Lang Publishing, New York, 1991)
 Savelli, Mary. Judith: a Prose Translation. The United States Chapter of Þa Engliscan Gesiðas, 1997.
 Smyth, Mary. “The Numbers in the Manuscript of the Old English Judith”. Modern Language Notes, Vol. 20, No. 7. (Nov. 1905), pp. 197–199.
 Szarmach, Paul E., Tavormina, M. Teresa, Rosenthal, Joel T. (editors). Medieval England: an Encyclopedia, New York: Garland, 1998.
 Woolf, R. E. "The Lost Opening to Judith". The Modern Language Review, Vol. 50, No. 2 (Apr. 1955), pp. 168–172.

External links

 The poem "Judith" is fully edited and annotated, with digital images of its manuscript pages, in the Old English Poetry in Facsimile Project: https://oepoetryfacsimile.org/
Judith in Old English
 A translation of the poem into Modern English.
 Full digital coverage of the manuscript on the British Library's Digitised Manuscripts website

Cultural depictions of Judith
Old English poems